The Glen Loy Aqueduct (or Glenloy Aqueduct) carries the Caledonian Canal over the River Loy, near Muirshearlich, between Banavie and Gairlochy.

History
The aqueduct was built between March and October 1806.

Design
The river runs through the middle arch, and roadways for pedestrian or animal use through the side arches paved with large cobbles.

It is one of six aqueducts between Neptune's Staircase and Loch Lochy.

References

External links

Navigable aqueducts in Scotland